Safor is a comarca within the province of Valencia, Spain. The capital is the city of Gandia, but also includes the towns of Oliva, Piles and Daimús, among others. The beach area of Gandia, La Platja, is well known for its wild nightlife during the summer.

The former natural and historical comarca of Valldigna has been integrated into Safor comarca for administrative purposes.

Municipalities

Ador
Alfauir
Almiserà
Almoines
L'Alqueria de la Comtessa
Barx
Bellreguard
Beniarjó
Benifairó de la Valldigna
Beniflà
Benirredrà
Castellonet de la Conquesta
Daimús
La Font d'En Carròs
Gandia
Guardamar de la Safor
Llocnou de Sant Jeroni
Miramar
Oliva
Palma de Gandia
Palmera
Piles
Potries
Rafelcofer
Real de Gandia
Ròtova
Simat de la Valldigna
Tavernes de la Valldigna
Villalonga
Xeraco
Xeresa

Climate

The predominant climate in La Safor is mediterranean-subtropical (Köppen climate classification: CSa) with very mild temperatures during winters, and hot summers. The annual average temperature depends on the zone, different temperature ranges occur near the sea to the mountains inland. Near the sea the average annual temperature is about 18-20 °C while in the interior the average annual temperatures are about 17-18 °C. Almost all of the cultivars in this zone are oranges and tangerines, so the majority of the zones are frostless. The rain quantity are different, with zones that can be considered as subtropical semi-arid BSh climates, and others that pertain to the CSa mediterranean climate with hot summers. The wettest season is the autumn. 
Climate data for Gandia:

See also 
Monastery of Sant Jeroni de Cotalba
 Route of the Monasteries of Valencia
 Route of the Borgias

References

External links 
gandialasafor.com

 
Comarques of the Valencian Community
Geography of the Province of Valencia